Hunterville is a small community on State Highway 1, in the Rangitikei district of the North Island of New Zealand. It is located halfway between Taupo and Wellington and has a population (2018 census) of 411, a decrease of 18 people from 2013.

The township was named for George Hunter, who was a member of the Wellington Provincial Council. It straddles the state highway as well as the main trunk railway in the foothills forming the gateway to the Central Plateau.

Kiwiburn, the New Zealand Burning Man regional burn, has been held there since 2014.

The closest airport or airfield to Hunterville is RNZAF Base Ohakea, an important Royal New Zealand Air Force base, which is sited 33 km to the south west. 6 km north of Hunterville is Vinegar Hill.

The Hunterville railway station on the North Island Main Trunk line opened in 1887 and closed in 1988.

Hunterville is well known for its statue of the huntaway, a specialised herding dog that uses its voice to drive the sheep. The town festival and market held on the first Saturday after Labour Day has a "Shepherds Shemozzle" – a race with man and dog with shepherds travelling from all over New Zealand to compete for the top prize.

Hunterville has marae, affiliated with Ngāti Hauiti hapū. Otāhuhu Marae and Te Ruku a Te Kawau meeting house is a meeting place for Ngāti Haukaha. Rātā or Te Hou Hou or Potaka Marae and Hauiti meeting house are affiliated with Ngāti Ruaanga and Ngāti Tamateraka.

From at least 1895 to 1948 the Hunterville Express was published in the town. It was one of 45 newspapers started by Joseph Ives. Other editors were Cuthbert James Powell, Walter Keay, who was also a novelist and whose wife had earlier signed a suffrage petition in 1893, when women first gained a vote. In 1905 it was the Hunterville Express and Upper Rangitikei Advertiser, published 3 times a week. The Express offices were burnt out in 1917.

Demographics

The population of Hunterville was 411 in the 2018 New Zealand census, a decrease of 18 (-4.2%) since the 2013 census, and a decrease of 30 (-6.8%) since the 2006 census. There were 210 males and 198 females, giving a sex ratio of 1.06 males per female. Ethnicities were 336 people  (81.8%) European/Pākehā, 90 (21.9%) Māori, 12 (2.9%) Asian and 9 (2.2%) of other ethnicities (totals add to more than 100% since people could identify with multiple ethnicities). Of the total population, 75 people  (18.2%) were under 15 years old, 60 (14.6%) were 15–29, 168 (40.9%) were 30–64, and 111 (27.0%) were over 65.

Otairi statistical area

Otairi had a population of 1,272 at the 2018 New Zealand census, an increase of 45 people (3.7%) since the 2013 census, and a decrease of 15 people (-1.2%) since the 2006 census. There were 510 households. There were 654 males and 618 females, giving a sex ratio of 1.06 males per female. The median age was 43 years (compared with 37.4 years nationally), with 252 people (19.8%) aged under 15 years, 213 (16.7%) aged 15 to 29, 555 (43.6%) aged 30 to 64, and 249 (19.6%) aged 65 or older.

Ethnicities were 86.6% European/Pākehā, 19.1% Māori, 0.9% Pacific peoples, 1.9% Asian, and 3.3% other ethnicities (totals add to more than 100% since people could identify with multiple ethnicities).

The proportion of people born overseas was 10.4%, compared with 27.1% nationally.

Although some people objected to giving their religion, 51.9% had no religion, 37.7% were Christian and 2.6% had other religions.

Of those at least 15 years old, 150 (14.7%) people had a bachelor or higher degree, and 231 (22.6%) people had no formal qualifications. The median income was $26,900, compared with $31,800 nationally. The employment status of those at least 15 was that 525 (51.5%) people were employed full-time, 180 (17.6%) were part-time, and 27 (2.6%) were unemployed.

Education

Notable people
William Meldrum (1865–1964), solicitor in Hunterville and chairman of the Hunterville Town Board prior to WWI.
Hadleigh Parkes (born 1987), professional Rugby Player, played for Super Rugby teams, Blues (Captain), Kings, and Hurricanes. Plays for Welsh regional team Scarlets (2014–) and was selected for the Welsh Test team in 2017.

References

Populated places in Manawatū-Whanganui
Rangitikei District